The Pontiac Torpedo was a full-sized car produced by Pontiac from the 1940 through the 1948 model year (war years excepted). When released, it was the biggest Pontiac, used an 8-cylinder engine, and it had more standard features than other Pontiacs. Although the Torpedo name was exclusive to the highest line of Pontiacs in 1940, in 1941 the name was applied to all Pontiacs in three separate lines. The Custom Torpedoes were now top-of-the-line name, while the DeLuxe Torpedo became the base line, and the Streamline Torpedo became the middle line of Pontiacs. All Torpedo models could be had with either a 6-cylinder or 8-cylinder engine beginning in 1941. From 1942 to 1948 the Torpedo name designated only the base line of Pontiacs. The Torpedo was replaced by the Pontiac Chieftain in 1949. It was with this generation that all GM vehicles experienced increased width dimensions to accommodate three passengers on the front bench seat and an additional three passengers on rear bench seat installed vehicles. This was accomplished with the deletion of running board thereby adding additional room inside the passenger compartment.

1940–1941

1940: Custom Torpedo (C-body) 
In 1940, Pontiac introduced the Custom Torpedo on the General Motors C-body. Along with Oldsmobile, Pontiac had the distinction of having all three of GM's mainstream platforms this year, but this would last only one more year. The new C-body that the 1940 Pontiac Torpedo shared with Cadillac Series 62, Buick Roadmaster and Super, and the Oldsmobile Series 90 featured cutting-edge "torpedo" styling. Shoulder and hip room was over  wider, running boards were eliminated and the exterior was streamlined and  lower. When combined with a column-mounted shift lever the cars offered true six passenger comfort which was shared with all GM products during this model year.

The 1940 Torpedo had larger windows and wider seats than other Pontiacs, front and rear "ventiplanes" on 4-door sedans and long gracefully streamlined rear decks. Concealed hinges were used on all doors. The doors were extra wide. The hood ornament had a plastic Indian head mounted in a metal base. Front end sheet metal looked like that on other Pontiacs. Eight-cylinder badges were used front and rear. The door locks had weather sealed keyholes. Gas filler tubes were enclosed under "flip-up" lids on the left rear fenders. The window openings were trimmed with bright metal moldings. It was only available with the Inline 8-cylinder engine and either as a 4-passenger 2-door Sedan or a 5-passenger 4-door Sedan. A heater, cigarette lighter, six-tube radios, an electric clock, and a trunk light were all optional.

1941: Torpedo name on all Pontiacs 

In 1941 the A-body and B-body were similarly redesigned with lower, wider running board-less bodies (though running boards were offered as an extra-cost option) Consequently, Pontiac renamed its entire line-up "Torpedo", with models ranging from the low-end A-bodied Deluxe Torpedo (with a 119-inch wheelbase), the mid-level B-bodied Streamliner Torpedo (with a 122-inch wheelbase), and the high-end C-bodied Custom Torpedo (with the same 122-inch wheelbase as the previous year). All models came with either the six- or eight-cylinder engines.A wide grille with horizontal bars was used on the A-bodied Deluxe Torpedo. The parking lights were built into the grille. Headlights were fully recessed into the new, wider fenders. Speed-line ribbing was molded into the sides of both front and rear fenders. Deluxe Sixes were in Series 25. Deluxe Eights were in Series 27. The sixes had shorter hood ornaments, a "6" badge on the hood and Pontiac lettering on the side. The eights had larger hood ornaments, an "8" badge on the hood and Pontiac Deluxe lettering on the side. Deluxe Torpedoes had notchback styling. Initially five body styles were available: a 3-passenger 2-door Business Coupe, a 5-passenger 2-door Sedan Coupe, a 5-passenger 2-door Sedan, a 5-passenger 2-door convertible and a 5-passenger 4-door Sedan. The 5-passenger 4-door Metropolitan Sedan was added in the middle of the model year. It had 4-window styling with rear ventiplanes similar to the 4-door Custom Torpedo Sedan instead of the 6-window styling found on the regular 4-door Deluxe Torpedo Sedan. The convertible had a power top.

Sleek fastback styling characterized the B-bodied Streamliner Torpedo. The roofline swept from the windshield to the rear bumper in one smooth curve. The front end sheet metal was the same as on the Deluxe Torpedo and trim difference between sixes and eights were also the same. Streamliner Sixes were in Series 26. Streamliner Eights were in Series 28. Beige corded wool cloth upholstery. There was also a Super Streamliner Torpedo subseries. Supers had the same body styling and trim but featured two-tone worsted wool cloth upholstery with pin stripes. They also added sponge rubber seat cushions, electric clocks, deluxe flexible steering wheels and divan type seats with folding center armrests. Two body-styles were available: a 5-passenger 2-door Sedan Coupe and a 5-passenger 4-door Sedan.

The C-bodied Custom Torpedo had a notchback sedan and coupe as the previous year but new was a 4-door 8-passenger wood bodied station wagon in standard or Deluxe trim. Styling was similar to the Deluxe and Streamliner Torpedoes as were the variations between the sixes and the eights. Custom Sixes were in Series 24. Custom Eights were in Series 29. Station wagon bodies were built by Hercules and Ionia. The Ionia bodies had a more rounded rear end treatment. Standard station wagons had imitation leather upholstery while Deluxe types had genuine leather cushions.

1941 was the last year Pontiac offered a model with the GM C-body until the big "Clamshell tailgate" Pontiac Safari and Grand Safari station wagons of 1971–76. The 1971–76 wagons were B-body variants with longer wheelbase than sedans.  You can find this designation on the cowl tag after 1973.  They will be "2B" for Pontiac B-body.

The only way to get an 8-cylinder engine on the GM A body from 1941 to 1948 was to buy an Oldsmobile Special 68 or a Pontiac Deluxe Torpedo Eight. In a sense these were perhaps the first muscle cars.

1942–1948 

For 1942, the Torpedo KA Line Series 25 and Series 27 name was assigned to the A-bodied Pontiac while the Streamliner KB Line became the B-bodied Pontiac. The grille got horizontal bars, while the headlamps were placed farther apart. Most Torpedoes continued to have the notchback styling found on the Deluxe Torpedoes. However a new body style to the A-bodied Pontiac was a 5-passenger 2-door Sedan Coupe which had fastback styling similar to the Streamliner. After December 15, 1941, the Torpedo received wartime 'black-out" trim, which meant that all the chrome pieces were painted in Duco Gun-Metal Grey.In 1946, the first postwar Pontiac's looked very similar to the pre-war models. The dash contained full instrumentation with round gauges. The engines were the same. The 4-window 4-door Metropolitan Sedan and the 2-door Club Coupe were discontinued.

1947 Torpedoes received a new "Chief Pontiac" hood ornament. An 8-tube radio became optional.

1948 was the last year for the Torpedo, receiving a new grill.   The Hydramatic automatic transmission became optional. Base price was $1,500.

See also 
Pontiac Streamliner

References 

Torpedo
Rear-wheel-drive vehicles